Todd Bernstein is the founder and director of the annual Greater Philadelphia Martin Luther King Day of Service.

Career
In 1994, Bernstein helped to create the King Day of Service with Harris Wofford and Congressman John Lewis, both veterans of the civil rights movement with Dr. King. Bernstein is also president of Global Citizen, a non-profit organization founded in 1995, which promotes sustainable civic engagement through volunteer service, locally and globally.

In 1996, Bernstein started the nation's first King Day of Service in Philadelphia. The Greater Philadelphia King Day of Service has drawn more than 1.2 million volunteers over twenty years.  Each year, it has been the largest King Holiday event in the nation.  In 2012, Vice President Joe Biden and Dr. Jill Biden participated.

Bernstein also founded MLK365, which transforms the King Day of Service into a year-round civic engagement initiative. This program promotes and supports sustainable civic engagement by providing ongoing volunteer opportunities, educational programs, and community partnerships across the Greater Philadelphia region.

Bernstein was named by President Barack Obama as a "Champion of Change" and honored at the White House on January 12, 2012. In 2000, the Points of Light Foundation recognized Bernstein with its national Point of Light Award. In 1999, the Points of Light Foundation honored the Greater Philadelphia King Day of Service as a national Point of Light.

In 1997, Bernstein served as national planner for the Presidents' Summit for America's Future. The five-day summit brought together America's living presidents and community leaders to address civic engagement and opportunities for America's at-risk young citizens. The event led to the creation of America's Promise: the Alliance for Youth.

In 2000, Bernstein served as director of the National Shadow Convention (a bi-partisan event held concurrently with the Republican and Democratic national conventions). He went on to serve as director of the King Day of Service National Expansion Initiative from 2006–2008.

In 2013, he was honored by the Bipartisan Policy Center in Washington, D.C. with the inaugural Public Service Award. In 2012, the Philadelphia Association of Black Journalists recognized him with the organization's Community Service Award. In 2009, Bernstein was awarded the Jewish Social Policy Action Network Social Justice Award and the National Association of Blacks in Criminal Justice Legacy Award. In 2003, the Philadelphia Inquirer also honored Bernstein with its Citizen Hero Award.

Bernstein holds a B.A. in Politics and American History from Ithaca College, and also studied for an M.G.A. at the University of Pennsylvania's Fels Center of Government.

References 

Living people
Year of birth missing (living people)
Ithaca College alumni
Fels Institute of Government alumni